Akash Bashir (22 June 1994 – 15 March 2015) was a Pakistani layman and a former student of the Don Bosco Technical Institute in Lahore, Pakistan. In December 2014 he joined the security team in charge of protecting the Church of Saint John in Lahore, in the predominantly Christian neighborhood of Youhanabad. On Sunday, 15 March 2015, he blocked a suicide bomber who was about to enter the church. The bomber detonated his bomb outside the church, killing both of them. In January 2022, he was named a Servant of God by Pope Francis, and the cause for his beatification was opened.

Life 
Bashir was born in the village of Risalpur. He studied at Salesian schools in Pakistan in Youhanabad, the Christian quarter of the city of Lahore. In 2014 he volunteered as a security guard for the Church of Saint John.

Suicide bombing attempt 
On 15 March 2015,  two suicide bombers went to the Church of Saint John and the Christ Church of the Church of Pakistan. Bashir, who was guarding the Church of Saint John on that day, stopped the bomber at the door. The bomber detonated the bomb, killing Bashir and two others. At around the same time, a bomb went off at Christ Church of the Church of Pakistan. Seventeen people were killed and about 70 were injured. Terrorist group Tehreek-e-Taliban Pakistan Jamaatul Ahrar later claimed responsibility for the attacks.

Cause of beatification of canonization 
On 31 January 2022, the cause of beatification and canonization of Bashir was introduced by the Archdiocese of Lahore. Pope Francis declared Bashir a Servant of God. He is the second native Pakistani candidate for sainthood in history of the Catholic Church in Pakistan after the martyred Catholic politician Clement Shahbaz Bhatti who was assassinated in 2011.

See also
 Lahore church bombings

References 

1994 births
2015 deaths
People from Lahore
Security guards killed in the line of duty
Pakistani Servants of God
21st-century Roman Catholic martyrs
21st-century venerated Christians